Nicole Webster is an Australian marine scientist who is Chief Scientist for the Australian Antarctic Division.

Early life 
Nicole Webster gained an undergraduate degree and PhD in marine biology at James Cook University. Professor Webster's research discovered that sponge-microbial associations are fairly uniform throughout large geographic zones and highlighted the specificity of this partnership. She also discovered that the breakdown of this symbiosis may be a good indicator of environmental stress.

Career 
Webster conducted postdoctoral research in Antarctica through the University of Canterbury and Gateway Antarctica. Her research analyzed how microbe symbiosis can be biologically indicative of environmental strain in Antarctic marine ecosystems and also examined how microorganisms trigger the settlement and metamorphosis of coral reef invertebrates.

Webster became a research scientist at the Australian Institute for Marine Science (AIMS) and Principal Research Fellow at the Australian Centre for Ecogenomics located at the University of Queensland.

In 2021, Webster was appointed Chief Scientist for the Australian Antarctic Division.

Awards 

 2010 Dorothy Hill Medal

References 

1973 births
Living people
Australian marine biologists
Australian people of English descent
British emigrants to Australia
People from Ormskirk